USS Sacramento (AOE-1) was the third ship in the United States Navy to bear the name, for both the river, and the capital city of California. She was the lead ship of her class of fast combat support ship.

She combined the functions of three logistics ships in one hull; fleet oiler (AO), ammunition ship (AE), and refrigerated stores ship (AFS).

Admiral Arleigh Burke originated the concept of a single supply ship system. He saw the design as an answer to logistics problems he encountered during World War II. The limited speed, range, and payload of early underway replenishment (UnRep) groups prevented resupply due to bad weather and tactical demands of the war. To counter these problems, the Fast Combat Support Ship (AOE) was designed.

Construction
The keel for the first of the Navy's fast combat support ships was laid at Puget Sound Naval Shipyard, Bremerton, Washington on 30 June 1961. The traditional champagne bottle was broken against the bow of AOE-1 on 14 September 1963, by the ship's sponsor, Mrs. Edmund Brown, wife of the Governor of California.

Sacramento was commissioned on 15 March 1964. Undersecretary of the Navy, Paul B. Fay Jr., addressed the crowd, stating, "The greatest pleasure I have in being here today is ... participating in the commissioning of a vessel which will provide the Navy with a unique capability hitherto never contained in one ship." He added the ship would be able to "run in speed with a destroyer escort, thereby giving our fast attack carrier task forces a flexibility of action hitherto unknown."

Service history

Sacramento served in the Gulf of Tonkin during the Vietnam War.  She was known as a "floating supermarket" because of all the goods she carried.

The FAST (Fast Automated Shuttle Transfer) cargo handling system originally installed was replaced with the STREAM (Standard Tensioned Replenishment Alongside Method) underway replenishment system in 1977.

Her original armament consisted of four twin 3"/50 caliber guns. The two forward guns were replaced by Mk.29 NATO Sea Sparrow in 1976, and the two aft mounts were replaced by Mk.15 Phalanx CIWS in 1981. 

Sacramento was deployed to the Persian Gulf and supported operations during the First Gulf War including Operations Desert Shield and Desert Storm.

In 1995, MK-23 TAS (Target Acquisition System) was installed to facilitate NSSMS and locate and track air threats.

In 1995 while in the Persian Gulf, the ship assisted in "Operation Southern Watch" and in "Operation Vigilant Sentinel".  During an underway replenishment with the  the Sacramento lost her steering and collided into the starboard side of the Abraham Lincoln, crushing the M-frames, partially crushing a female crew berthing area, and punching a large hole in the TACAN room of the Sacramento.  The Lincoln sustained damage to her catwalks, an aircraft elevator was jammed into the up position and an approximately 10 ft2 hole was torn into the island.  Both ships had to dock at Jebel Ali, U.A.E. for repair, the latter for several weeks.

In 1996 the Sacramento had one NATO Sea Sparrow launcher on the forecastle, two Phalanx CIWS past mid-ship port and starboard, one 25 mm automatic cannon on the port side, and four .50 caliber machine guns: two port and two starboard. The ship was also fitted with electronic warfare equipment: an AN/SLQ-32 with four MK.36 super-RBOC (Rapid Bloom Offboard Chaff) decoys, and an AN/SLQ-25 towed torpedo decoy (NIXIE) run by an electronics technician.

Sacramento was the first AOE to ever qualify for an electromagnetic interference certificate in 1996.

Sacramento decommissioned in October 2004. On 13 April 2007, a contract for the ship's disposal was awarded to Esco Marine. Sacramento was scrapped by Esco Marine in Brownsville, Texas, early 2008.

Performance
Sacramento is considered a benchmark in West Coast shipbuilding. Only s and aircraft carriers have greater displacements than Sacramento.

The ship's main engines came from the never-completed battleship , and delivered in excess of 100,000 shaft horsepower (75 MW) to two 23-foot (7 m) screws weighing 19.25 tons each, the largest on any ship in the Navy.

Sacramento was the fastest AOE (fast combat support ship) ever.  The Sacramento routinely went head-to-head in speed runs and won against the west coast's AOE's, including the 

Awards

Joint Meritorious Unit Award
Navy Unit Commendation – 2 awards
Meritorious Unit Citation – 3 awards
Navy E Ribbon –  4 awards
Navy Expeditionary Medal – 2 awards
National Defense Service Medal – 3 awards
Armed Forces Expeditionary Medal – 7 awards
Vietnam Service Medal with 13 campaign stars
Southwest Asia Service Medal with 3 campaign stars
Global War on Terrorism Expeditionary Medal
Global War on Terrorism Service Medal
Republic of Vietnam Campaign Medal
Kuwait Liberation Medal

References

External links

 
 united-states-navy.com: USS Sacramento
 combatindex.com: USS Sacramento
 navsource.org: USS Sacramento

 

Sacramento-class fast combat support ships
1963 ships
Vietnam War auxiliary ships of the United States